Betampona Reserve is a nature reserve in the Atsinanana Region of Madagascar. It is located 40 km northwest of Toamasina and was established in 1927. The area of the reserve is 29.2 km.

Like most of the geology of the central and eastern coasts of Madagascar, Betampona consists of metamorphic and igneous rocks of the precambrian basement. 

Betampona is typical of other Malagasy rainforests, which is characterized by a large variety of low canopies and small trees compared to rainforests in other parts of the world. 

A hot and humid climate prevails.

References 

UNEP World Database on Protected Areas: Betampona Reserve
UNEP World Conservation Monitoring Centre: Site Sheet on Betampona Reserve

National parks of Madagascar
Protected areas established in 1927
1927 establishments in Madagascar
Madagascar lowland forests
Important Bird Areas of Madagascar